A by-election was held in the Legislative Assembly of Queensland seat of Mulgrave on 5 December 1998. It was triggered by the resignation of sitting One Nation member Charles Rappolt.

The by-election was won by Labor candidate Warren Pitt.

Background

Charles Rappolt came to parliament as one of 11 One Nation candidates elected at the 1998 state election. Rappolt won the seat of Mulgrave with 54.2% of the two party preferred vote. However, Rappolt found it difficult to cope with the pressures of public life and resigned his seat just four months into his term.

Candidates

The by-election pitted two former members for Mulgrave against each other. The National Party endorsed Naomi Wilson who had held the seat from 1995 to 1998 before her defeat to Rappolt at the 1998 state election. The Labor Party preselected Warren Pitt, member for Mulgrave from 1989 to 1995 before his defeat to Wilson at the 1995 state election. Pitt had also unsuccessfully stood for the seat at the 1998 state election, and would have won if not for Coalition preferences leaking to Rappolt.

One Nation chose Peter Boniface to defend the seat.

Result

With One Nation failing to repeat their strong state election performance, the contest reverted to a more typical Labor versus National contest. Labor's Warren Pitt prevailed narrowly.

Aftermath
Where previously the Labor government of Peter Beattie had governed in the minority—they held 44 seats in an 89-seat parliament and depended upon the support of independent MP Peter Wellington—their victory in Mulgrave gave the government an outright majority of 45 seats.

See also
List of Queensland state by-elections

References

1998 elections in Australia
Queensland state by-elections
1990s in Queensland